Kashchey is an archetypal male antagonist in Russian folklore.
 Koschei, often given the epithet "the Immortal", or "the Deathless".
 Kashchey the Immortal  is a 1945 black and white Soviet fantasy film.
 Kashchey Bessmertnyi is a 1994 album by Russian punk group Sektor Gaza.
 Kashchey the Deathless is a one-act opera in three scenes by Nikolai Rimsky-Korsakov.